Joseph Andrew Mitchell (November 27, 1876 – June 9, 1925) was an American sailor serving in the United States Navy during the Boxer Rebellion who received the Medal of Honor for bravery.

Biography
Mitchell was born November 27, 1876, in Philadelphia, Pennsylvania, and after entering the navy he was sent as a Gunner's Mate First Class to China to fight in the Boxer Rebellion.

He died June 9, 1925, and is buried in Saint Pauls Cemetery 
Portsmouth, Virginia.

Medal of Honor citation
Rank and organization: Gunner's Mate First Class, U.S. Navy. Born: 27 November 1876, Philadelphia, Pa. Accredited to: Pennsylvania. G.O. No.: 55, 19 July 1901.

Citation: 
<blockquote> In the presence of the enemy during the battle of Peking, China, 12 July 1900, Mitchell distinguished himself by meritorious conduct.

See also

List of Medal of Honor recipients
List of Medal of Honor recipients for the Boxer Rebellion

References

External links

1876 births
1925 deaths
United States Navy Medal of Honor recipients
United States Navy sailors
American military personnel of the Boxer Rebellion
Military personnel from Philadelphia
Boxer Rebellion recipients of the Medal of Honor